The 2014 FIBA Africa Under-18 Championship was the 19th FIBA Africa Under-18 Championship, played under the rules of FIBA, the world governing body for basketball, and the FIBA Africa thereof. The tournament was hosted by Madagascar from August 2 to 10, with the games played at the Palais des Sports Mahamasina in Antananarivo.

Egypt defeated Tunisia 80–69 in the final to win their 5th title. The tournament qualified both the winner and the runner-up for the 2015 Under-19 World Cup.

Squads

Draw

Preliminary round 

Times given below are in UTC+3.

Group A

Group B

Knockout stage
Championship bracket

5-8th bracket

Quarter finals

5–8th place classification

Semifinals

7th place match

5th place match

Bronze medal match

Final

Final standings

Egypt rosterAhmed Mahmoud, Mamdouh Elkaft, Basem Alian, Kareem Aly, Mahmoud Mahmoud, Mohamed Mohamed, Abdelrahman Mohamed, Ahmed Elsayed, Karim Azab, Bassam Hassan, Mohamed Youssef, Mohamed Mohamed, Coach: Jemc Branislav

Awards

All-Tournament Team
  G Gerson Domingos MVP
  G Amboudou Karaboue
  F Abdelrahman Mohamed
  F Yann Rakotomalala
  C Sagaba Konate

Statistical Leaders

Individual Tournament Highs

Points

Rebounds

Assists

Steals

Blocks

Turnovers

2-point field goal percentage

3-point field goal percentage

Free throw percentage

Individual Game Highs

Team Tournament Highs

Points

Rebounds

Assists

Steals

Blocks

Turnovers

2-point field goal percentage

3-point field goal percentage

Free throw percentage

Team Game highs

See also
2013 FIBA Africa Under-16 Championship

External links
Official Website
Sportstats Profile
Scorespro Profile
Afrobasket Profile

References

FIBA Africa Under-18 Championship
FIBA Africa Under-18 Championship
Under-18 Championship
FIBA Africa Under-18 Championship
International basketball competitions hosted by Madagascar